Køge Nord (North) Station is an Intercity, regional and S-train station that opened on 1 June 2019 in Køge, Denmark. It is about 35 km southwest of Copenhagen. The station and the Copenhagen–Ringsted Line constitute part of the Fehmarn Belt connection to Germany, and also the main line to western Denmark. It will allow passengers to change trains between high-speed rail services and S-trains, as well as regional services. Crown Prince Frederik inaugurated the station on 31 May 2019.

The six platforms are built on each side of an eight-lane motorway (two S-train platforms to the east; the main line platforms to the west) and are connected by a 225-metre pedestrian bridge. The high-speed line between Ny Ellebjerg and Ringsted is now completed, but adjustments are needed at Ringsted station before trains can start running at 250 km/h. S-trains and a limited regional service began using Køge Nord the day after its inauguration. Intercity services started in December 2019.

The station was chosen as a world selection for the 2020 edition of the Prix Versailles in the passenger stations category, and won the special prize exterior.

See also
 High-speed rail in Denmark
 Copenhagen–Ringsted Line
 Køge Bay Line
 List of railway stations in Denmark

References

S-train (Copenhagen) stations
Railway stations opened in 2019
Railway stations in Region Zealand
Railway stations in Denmark opened in the 21st century